A hydroscope is any of several instruments related to water:

One kind is an instrument for making observations below the surface of water, such as a long tube fitted with various lenses arranged so that objects lying at the bottom can be reflected upon a screen on the deck of the ship that carries it. These are built with a large tire tube that supports the screen and covered by an acrylic dome for protection. 
Another kind detects subsurface water through nuclear magnetic resonance using the surface nuclear magnetic resonance technique.
An instrument (likely a hydrometer) described by Synesius in his Letter 15 to Hypatia, written in 402 AD. There are references to such instruments as early as the fourth century.
Another ancient Greek instrument: a water clock or clepsydra.

Sources and notes

Optical instruments